Castilla (L52) is a  (LPD), and is the twelfth ship of this name. She is the sister ship to the amphibious warfare vessel . The vessel is primarily used to transport Spanish marines but is also used for humanitarian aid missions. Launched in 1999 and commissioned in 2000, Castilla took part in Operation Romeo Sierra as part of the Perejil Island crisis in 2002, has participated in multiple military exercises with NATO and provided humanitarian relief in the Caribbean Sea and Gulf of Mexico.

Design and description
The project began in the Netherlands in 1990 as that country sought a solution to their LPD requirements. Spain joined the project in July 1991 and the definition stage was completed by December 1993. The Galicia class spawned from the joint Enforcer design with Spain's lead ship being authorised on 29 July 1994. The LPDs were designed to transport a battalion of marines and disembark them offshore and general logistic support.

The ships have a  electric plant comprising four diesel generators capable of creating  and an emergency  generator.

The Galicia class have a  flight deck capable of operating helicopters. The vessels have hangar area for four heavy or six medium helicopters. The LPDs usually sail with six AB 212 or four SH-3D helicopters embarked. They have a  well deck and are capable of operating six landing craft vehicle and personnel (LCVP) or four landing craft mechanized (LCM) or one landing craft utility and one LCVP. Normally, they operate with four LCM-1E craft. However, a maximum of 170 vehicles can be carried depending on size. Castilla can transport 404 fully-equipped troops and 72 staff and aircrew. 

The LPDs are armed with two Oerlikon Contraves  cannon but can be fitted with four. They also mount six Sippican Hycor SRBOC MK36 chaff launchers. The Galicia class is equipped with KH 1007 air/surface search radar and AN/TPX-54 (V) Mk-XII (mode 4) identification friend or foe. Castilla has a complement of 189.

Construction and career

Ordered on 9 May 1997, the vessel's keel was laid down on 11 December 1997 at the Empresa Nacional Bazán shipyards in Ferrol.

Castilla participated in Operation Romeo Sierra in Perejil Island on 17 July 2002 during the Perejil Island crisis. The LPD took part in the cleanup following the wreck of the tanker  and the resulting oil spill from December 2002 to February 2003. In 2002–2003 the ship underwent a refit that improved the vessel's command, control and communications capabilities. In July 2003, Castilla transported the Spanish Legion to Ash Shuahyabah, United Arab Emirates as part of Operation IF, returning in September. The ship was then sent to provide humanitarian aid to Haiti as part Operation Mar Caribe from October to December 2004.

On 28 October 2004, Castilla deployed to Cap-Haïtien, Haiti, and delivered some marines. Castilla participated in the NATO military exercise Operation Loyal Mariner 2005, as the flagship of the sea elements. Spain sent Castilla to New Orleans as part of NATO's Hurricane Katrina relief operation in Louisiana, in mid-September 2005. Castilla participated in the NATO exercises Operation Brilliant Mariner 2006, as the flagship of the sea elements, and the NATO exercise Operation Steadfast Jackpot 2006.

Spain dispatched Castilla on 22 January 2010 to aid in relief efforts after the 7.0 magnitude 12 January 2010 Haiti earthquake as part of Operación Hispaniola. The mission was announced on 19 January 2010, with the ship transporting a field hospital, 50 medical officers and 450 troops. Also on board were three helicopters, and several fast boats. Castilla left Naval Station Rota on 22 January, carrying 423 troops, and 4 helicopters, headed for Petit-Goâve, Haiti. On 1 February, Castilla arrived at San Juan, Puerto Rico to pick up additional supplies. On 4 February, Castilla arrived at Petit-Goâve. As of 5 February, landing craft from the ship began disgorging equipment. Castilla was expected to remain on-station at Petit-Goâve for three months.

On 10 May 2010, Castilla was tasked to assist the motor yacht Sagamar, with its 33-year-old injured crew member. The team from Castilla successfully extracted the injured, began medical treatment and disembarked him in the Azores for further medical treatment.

In February 2021, Castilla took the role of the flagship in European Union's Operation Atalanta, fighting piracy. It was the flagship for four months. It also conducted exercises with JS Ariake of the Japan Maritime Self-Defense Force.

Notes

Citations

References

External links

Amphibious warfare vessels of Spain
Galicia-class landing platform docks
2010 Haiti earthquake relief
1999 ships